Montague Road may refer to:

 Montague Road, Adelaide, part of Australian National Route A20 adjoining Main North Road
 Montague Road, London, part of the Pymmes Brook Trail in the London Borough of Enfield, UK
 Montague Road, Mass, part of Massachusetts Route 63, USA
 Montague Road, Nova Scotia, provides access to Montague Gold Mines, Nova Scotia, Canada
 Montague Road, Prince Edward Island, part of Route 3 (Prince Edward Island), Canada
 Montague Road School, which was replaced by The National School in Nottinghamshire, UK
 "Montague Road" (song), a track on Laura Veirs album The Triumphs and Travails of Orphan Mae